Pirates: The Legend of Black Kat (whose working title was Pirates of Skull Cove) is a 2002 action-adventure video game developed by Westwood Studios and published by Electronic Arts for the PlayStation 2 and Xbox.

Synopsis 
The game takes place in the year 1762 and focuses on the adventures of Katarina de Leon. Leon's father is the Pirate Isles governor (Marcus de Leon) and her mother is the Pirates of Skull Cove leader (Mara Rousseau). Leon sails the Five Seas in search of her mother’s grave, and to take revenge against Captain Hawke for killing her father. Kat must search for the mystical Chartstones to get to Hawke which requires her braving the dangerous and savage islands of the Five Seas infested with Hawke’s men, the Crimson Guard.

Throughout the game, Kat confronts dangerous creatures and savages, completes quests for island inhabitants in return for help, wage naval battles against the Crimson Guard, collect magical objects and artifacts, booty and unearth buried treasure which she can use to upgrade her ship. She also discovers the truth about her mother, Mara, and ultimately avenges her father’s death by defeating the evil Captain Hawke.

Reception 

The game received "average" reviews on both platforms according to the review aggregation website Metacritic.

References

External links 

2002 video games
Action-adventure games
Electronic Arts games
PlayStation 2 games
Cultural depictions of Blackbeard
Video games about pirates
Video games scored by Frank Klepacki
Video games featuring female protagonists
Westwood Studios games
Xbox games
Video games developed in the United States
Single-player video games